The Belarus national baseball team is the national baseball team of Belarus. The team competed in the bi-annual European Baseball Championship. In reaction to the 2022 Russian invasion of Ukraine, WBSC Europe excluded Belarusian teams from all its competitions for both national and club teams to be held in Europe in 2022.

Tournament results
European Youth Baseball Championship

European Juveniles Baseball Championship

References

External links
 Belarus baseball official site

National baseball teams in Europe
base